, also known as itv, is a Japanese broadcast network affiliated with the JNN. Their headquarters are located in Matsuyama, Ehime Prefecture.

History
26 April 1991: License awarded
1 October 1992: It was set up as the third broadcasting station of Ehime Prefecture.
1 April 1993: Sunday Morning moves to i-TV from RNB.
1 October 2002: Upon celebrating its tenth anniversary, the legal name changes from Iyo TV Corporation to i-TV Corporation.
1 October 2006: Digital terrestrial television broadcasts commenced (Matsuyama Main Station).

Stations

Analog Stations 
Matsuyama (Main Station) JOEH-TV 29ch 10 kW
Niihama 27ch 1 kW, 16ch 200w
Uwajima 25ch 500w
Kikuma 50ch 100w
Ōzu 42ch 100w
Yawatahama 23ch 100w
Minamiuwa 26ch 100w
Kawanoe 26ch 30w
Nakayama 22ch 30w
Iwaki 31ch 10w
Yura 46ch 10w
Johoku 32ch 10w
Hojo 61ch 10w
Uwajima-Takamitsu 60ch 0.1w
Uwa-Masanobu 59ch 0.1w
Kawauchi 51ch 10w
Yoshida-Nakanoura 58ch 0.1w
Honai-Kiki 39ch 0.1w
Hiyoshi 54ch 10w
Uwa 38ch 10w
Matsuyama-Iwaidani 48ch 0.1w
Kuma 57ch 30w
Kuma-Sugo 50ch 0.1w
Ōzu-Yasarai 53ch 0.1w
Tsushima-Enjo 44ch 0.1w
Yoshida-Tachime 50ch 0.1w
Uwajima-Hote 49ch 0.1w
Tsushima-Arashi 38ch 0.1w
Tsushima-Yokoura 38ch 0.1w
Shirokawa 39ch 10w
Uwajima-Shimotakagushi 41ch 0.1w
Iwaki-Okogi 45ch 0.1w
Uwajima-Hota 41ch 0.1w
Mikawa 37ch 30w
Tsushima 39ch 10w
Uchiko 60ch 30w
Karakodai 62ch 1w
Asakura 19ch 0.1w

Digital Stations(ID:6)
Matsuyama(Main Station) JOEH-DTV 21ch

Programs
Catch-i - from 18:16 until 18:55 on Weekdays

Rival Stations
Nankai Broadcasting(RNB)
Ehime Broadcasting(EBC)
Ehime Asahi Television(eat)

External links
 i-Television Homepage 

Companies based in Ehime Prefecture
Japan News Network
Television stations in Japan
Television channels and stations established in 1992
Mass media in Matsuyama, Ehime